During the 2007–08 season, Partick Thistle participated in the Scottish First Division and finished the season in 6th place. They reached the Quarter Final of the Scottish Cup, where they took eventual winners Rangers to a replay. The season saw the return of former Jag David Rowson who played in 45 competitive matches, the most appearances for any player. This season was Ian McCall's first season in charge of the club as manager.

Team kit
The team kit for the 2007–08 season was produced by Diadora and the main shirt sponsor was Resolution Asset Management.

Current squad

Match results

Friendlies

First Division

Scottish Cup

League Cup

Challenge Cup

Player statistics

Goalscorers

League table

References 

Partick Thistle F.C. seasons
Partick Thistle